From 1906 to 1926, the Finnish Swimming Federation did not arrange a dedicated national competition, but spread out the hosting duties of the championship events to multiple clubs.

Diving

Men

Plain 
Competed in Hanko on 10 August 1913.

Source:

Platform 
Competed in Helsinki on 2 August 1913.

Source:

Springboard 
Competed in Helsinki on 3 August 1913.

Source:

Women

Platform 
Competed in Helsinki on 3 August 1913.

Source:

Swimming

Men

100 metre freestyle 
Competed in Vaasa on 27 July 1913.

Source:

500 metre freestyle 
Competed in Turku on 10 August 1913.

Source:

1000 metre freestyle 
Competed in Tampere on 25 August 1913.

Source:

100 metre backstroke 
Competed in Pori on 16 August 1913.

Source:

100 metre breaststroke 
Competed in Tampere on 24 August 1913.

Source:

200 metre breaststroke 
Competed in Turku on 10 August 1913.

Source:

400 metre breaststroke 
Competed in Pori on 16 August 1913.

Arvo Aaltonen's time broke the Finnish record, but could not be ratified because it was swum in a river.

Source:

100 metre life saving 
Competed in Pori on 17 August 1913.

Seuderling's time broke the Finnish record, but could not be ratified because it was swum in a river.

Source:

4 × 50 metre freestyle relay 
Competed in Vaasa on 27 July 1913.

Source:

Women

50 metre freestyle 
Competed in Helsinki on 2 August 1913.

Source:

100 metre freestyle 
Competed in Helsinki on 3 August 1913.

Source:

Water polo

Men 
Competed in Tampere.

Matches:
 on 24 August 1913:
 Tampereen Uimaseura won Hämeenlinnan Uimaseura 5–0
 on 25 August 1913:
 Helsingfors Simsällskap won Turun Uimaseura 1–0 (1–0, 0–0)
 Helsingfors Simsällskap won Tampereen Uimaseura by forfeit
 Turun Uimaseura won Tampereen Uimaseura by forfeit

Source:

Sources

References 

National swimming competitions
National championships in Finland
Swimming competitions in Finland
1913 in Finnish sport
1913 in water sports
Diving competitions in Finland
Water polo competitions